Kristi Miller-North (born December 22, 1985) is an American former professional tennis player. She was raised in Marysville, Michigan and played collegiate tennis for Georgia Tech.

Miller made history in 2005 as Georgia Tech's first female All-American and was a winner of the 2005-06 Honda Sports Award. In 2006-07, she was a member of Georgia Tech's NCAA championship winning team. They secured the title by beating UCLA in the championship match at home in Athens and contributed with a win over Riza Zalameda in No. 1 singles.

A right-handed player, Miller competed briefly on the professional tour after graduation and won three ITF titles in doubles. Her best performance on tour came while she was still at Georgia Tech in 2005, when she teamed up with Megan Bradley to make the second round of the US Open women's doubles.

ITF Circuit finals

Singles: 2 (0–2)

Doubles: 4 (3–1)

References

External links
 
 

1985 births
Living people
American female tennis players
Georgia Tech Yellow Jackets women's tennis players
Tennis people from Michigan
People from Marysville, Michigan
Sportspeople from Metro Detroit